James Fields may refer to:

 James A. Fields (1844–1903), prominent lawyer and member of the Virginia House of Delegates
 James A. Fields House, a historic home located in the Brookville Heights neighborhood of Newport News, Virginia
 James Alex Fields Jr. (born 1997), convicted perpetrator of the 2017 Charlottesville car attack
 James B. Fields (1850–1896), Baptist preacher and orator
 James C. Fields, American civil servant, member of the Alabama House of Representatives, and minister in the United Methodist Church
 James H. Fields (1920–1970), a United States Army captain and recipient of the Medal of Honor
 James Henry Fields, American pianist
 James L. Fields, American sound engineer
 James T. Fields (1817–1881), American publisher, editor, and poet
 Jim Fields (born 1958), American film director, producer, playwright and actor

See also
James Field (disambiguation)